Manchi Manasulu is a 1962 Indian Telugu-language drama film directed by Adurthi Subba Rao. It stars Akkineni Nageswara Rao and Savitri, with music composed by K. V. Mahadevan. The film was produced by  C. Sundaram under the Babu Movies banner. The film was a remake of the Tamil film Kumudham (1961), also directed by Subba Rao.

Plot
Venu is a very poor student and seeks to come out of the hostel by being unable to bear its expenses. Thus, he shifts to a lawyer Anand Rao's summer-house, who gives it to him free of cost. Venu has a brother who is a blacksmith and funds Venu's studies and his daughter's needs in their village. Anand Rao's wife doesn't agree to give their summer house to a bachelor, so Anand Rao insists that he is married.

The lawyer has a daughter Santhi who falls in love with Venu. Her parents agree to their marriage after discussions. Venu completes his B. A. degree and goes to his village. His brother dies of ill health and asks him to take care of his daughter Jaya. Jaya loves a man named Kumar, who is very deceptive and has a blind sister Radha. When Venu asks Kumar's parents to get Jaya married to their son, they agree on one condition Venu should marry their daughter. So, Venu and Santhi sacrifice their love. Venu is guilty of dumping Santhi so he doesn't show affection to his wife. One day Santhi comes and mitigates the situation. Radha's brother and his wife create a nuisance. Radha becomes pregnant.

To keep her away from all these problems, he takes his wife to Hampi in Vijayanagara on Santhi's advice. There, Kumar cheats on a lady and kills her on a mountain. Hearing her screaming, Venu arrives there and sees the culprit and gets caught by police to save Kumar's life for the sake of his brother's daughter. Santhi who is now a lawyer takes up his case and proves that he is innocent in the court and unveils the culprit with the help of strong evidence brought by Jaya, who becomes remorseful and confesses. The story ends with Venu and his family leading a happy life.

Cast
Akkineni Nageswara Rao as Venu 
Savitri as Santhi 
Shavukaru Janaki as Radha
S. V. Ranga Rao as Ananda Rao
Gummadi as Rangayya
Ramana Reddy as Sankarayya
Nagabhushanam as Kumar 
Allu Ramalingaiah as Bheemanna, witness
Vangara as Vaikuntam
Suryakantham as Suryakanthamma
Vasanthi as Jaya
Potti Prasad as Jogulu, Kumar's sidekick
Chidatala Appa Rao
Suryakala

Music 

Music was composed by K. V. Mahadevan. Music released on Audio Company. The song "Mava Mava" was remixed in Big Boss (1995).

References

External links
 

1962 films
1960s Telugu-language films
Films scored by K. V. Mahadevan
Telugu remakes of Tamil films
Films directed by Adurthi Subba Rao